Robie Robertson (June 22, 1931 – March 8, 2019) was an American screenwriter and visual effects artist. He won an Academy Award in the category Best Visual Effects for the film Marooned.

Selected filmography 
 Marooned (1969)

References

External links 

1931 births
2019 deaths
Place of birth missing
Visual effects artists
Visual effects supervisors
Best Visual Effects Academy Award winners
American male screenwriters
20th-century American screenwriters